The Großer Auersberg is a mountain, in the Bavarian part of the Rhön mountains. It is located in an unparished area, 4.68 km² in area, in the county of Bad Kissingen, three kilometres southwest of the village centre of Wildflecken. The Großer Auersberg is covered by dense deciduous forest and lies within the Wildflecken Training Area, established in 1938. The entire terrain is a military out-of-bounds area, which civilians may not enter. A good two kilometres to the west-southwest rises the slightly less high Kleiner Auersberg. Neither should be confused with the Auersberg near Hilders in the Hessian part of the Rhön.

See also 
List of mountains and hills of the Rhön

References 

Mountains under 1000 metres
Mountains of Bavaria
Mountains and hills of the Rhön
Bad Kissingen (district)
Wildflecken Training Area